Robert Charles Moon (1844–1914) was an ophthalmologist who practiced medicine in England and the United States. He was the son of William Moon (1818–1894), inventor of "Moon type", an embossed alphabet for the blind.

Robert Moon's career choice in ophthalmology was influenced by his experiences as a youth, helping his father in translating and transcribing reading matter for the visually handicapped. From 1866 to 1878 he practiced medicine at the South London Ophthalmic Hospital, a facility founded in 1857 by John Zachariah Laurence (1829–1870). Along with Dr. Laurence, the "Laurence–Moon syndrome" is named, a disease characterized by retinitis pigmentosa combined with several additional symptoms.

In 1879 Moon emigrated to the United States, where he settled into an ophthalmological practice in Philadelphia. Following retirement, he became involved in a number of philanthropic activities for the blind. In 1905 he became editor of the monthly "Moon Magazine", published by Gardner's Trust for the Blind. Also, he served as secretary for the Philadelphia Home Teaching Society.

Moon is interred at West Laurel Hill Cemetery, Providence Section, Lot 622, Bala Cynwyd, Pennsylvania.

References 
 Robert Charles Moon @ Who Named It

British ophthalmologists
English philanthropists
1844 births
1914 deaths
19th-century American philanthropists